Odonthalitus viridimontis is a species of moth of the family Tortricidae. It is found in Costa Rica.

The length of the forewings is 5-5.5 mm for males and 5-6.5 mm for females. The forewings are greyish white with yellow transverse striae. The hindwings are light grey brown with darker grey-brown mottling.

Etymology
The species name refers to Monteverde, the type locality.

References

Moths described in 2000
Euliini